Klockare is a surname.  Notable people with the surname include:

 Lennart Klockare (born 1945), Swedish politician
 Stefan Klockare (born 1972), Swedish ice hockey player